VEG may refer to:

Covenant of Free Evangelical Congregations in the Netherlands, a Reformed denomination in the Netherlands
Geisenheim Alumni Association, an alumni network in Germany
Volkseigenes Gut, a state-owned farm in the German Democratic Republic
.veg, file extension for projects in Vegas Pro

See also
Vegetable